The 1949 World Archery Championships was the 13th edition of the event. It was held in Paris, France on 9–12 August 1949 and was organised by World Archery Federation (FITA).

Medals summary

Recurve

Medals table

References

External links
 World Archery website
 Complete results

World Championship
World Archery
A
World Archery Championships
International archery competitions hosted by France